The Chicago Outdoor Film Festival has been showing classic films in Chicago's Grant Park for 10 years.  For seven consecutive evenings in the summer people gather around a gigantic screen and enjoy classic American films.  2009 marked the 10th Anniversary of the film festival which begins on July 14. The festival was not run in 2010 because of budgetary reasons.

The line up for the 2009 Chicago Outdoor Film Festival:

 Sunset Blvd. (July 14)
 Duck Soup (July 21)
 Cat on a Hot Tin Roof (July 28)
 Born Yesterday (Aug. 4)
 Psycho (Aug. 11)
 Young Mr. Lincoln (Aug. 18)
 Tootsie (Aug. 25)

Films began at sunset in Grant Park at Butler Field and admission was free every night.

External links
 

Film festivals in Chicago